William Springer may refer to:

William McKendree Springer (1836–1903), United States Representative from Illinois
William L. Springer (1909–1992), U.S. Representative from Illinois